Barcelona El Clot-Aragó is a Rodalies de Catalunya station in El Camp de l'Arpa del Clot, in the Sant Martí district of Barcelona in Catalonia, Spain. Passengers can commute here to Barcelona Metro station Clot. Like its metro counterpart, the station is completely underground, under Carrer d'Aragó and Avinguda Meridiana.

References

External links
 Barcelona El Clot-Aragó listing at Rodalies de Catalunya website
 Information and photos of the station at trenscat.cat 

Railway stations in Barcelona
Sant Martí (district)
Rodalies de Catalunya stations
Railway stations located underground in Spain